Sovereignty over the Chagos Archipelago is disputed between Mauritius and the United Kingdom. Mauritius has repeatedly stated that the Chagos Archipelago is part of its territory and that the United Kingdom claim is a violation of United Nations resolutions banning the dismemberment of colonial territories before independence. The UK government has stated that it has "no doubt" about its sovereignty over the Chagos, yet has also said that the Chagos will be returned to Mauritius once the islands are no longer required for military purposes. Given the absence of any meaningful progress with the UK, Mauritius took up the matter at various legal and political forums. 
The African Union and the Non-Aligned Movement have expressed unanimous support for Mauritius.

On 3 November 2022, it was announced that the UK and Mauritius had decided to begin negotiations on sovereignty over the British Indian Ocean Territory, taking into account the recent international legal proceedings.

History
The Constitution of Mauritius states that the Outer islands of Mauritius includes the islands of Mauritius, Rodrigues, Agaléga, Cargados Carajos and the Chagos Archipelago, including Diego Garcia and any other island comprised in the State of Mauritius. The Government of the Republic of Mauritius has stated that it does not recognise the British Indian Ocean Territory (BIOT) which the United Kingdom created by excising the Chagos Archipelago from the territory of Mauritius prior to its independence, and claims that the Chagos Archipelago including Diego Garcia forms an integral part of the territory of Mauritius under both Mauritian law and international law.

In 1965, the United Kingdom split the Chagos Archipelago away from Mauritius, and the islands of Aldabra, Farquhar, and Desroches from the Seychelles, to form the British Indian Ocean Territory. The islands were formally established as an overseas territory of the United Kingdom on 8 November 1965. However, with effect from 23 June 1976, Aldabra, Farquhar, and Desroches were returned to the Seychelles on their attaining independence.

On 18 March 2015, the Permanent Court of Arbitration unanimously held that the marine protected area (MPA) which the United Kingdom declared around the Chagos Archipelago in April 2010 was created in violation of international law. The Prime Minister of Mauritius has stated that this is the first time that the country's conduct with regard to the Chagos Archipelago has been considered and condemned by any international court or tribunal. He described the ruling as an important milestone in the relentless struggle, at the political, diplomatic, and other levels, of successive Governments over the years for the effective exercise by Mauritius of the sovereignty it claims over the Chagos Archipelago. The tribunal considered in detail the undertakings given by the United Kingdom to the Mauritian Ministers at the Lancaster House talks in September 1965. The UK had argued that those undertakings were not binding and had no status in international law. The Tribunal firmly rejected that argument, holding that those undertakings became a binding international agreement upon the independence of Mauritius, and have bound the UK ever since. It found that the UK's commitments towards Mauritius in relation to fishing rights and oil and mineral rights in the Chagos Archipelago are legally binding.

On 22 June 2017, by a margin of 94 to 15 countries, the UN General Assembly asked the International Court of Justice ("ICJ") to give an advisory opinion on the separation of the Chagos Archipelago from Mauritius before the country's independence in the 1960s. In September 2018, the International Court of Justice began hearings on the case. 17 countries argued in favour of Mauritius. The UK apologised for the "shameful" way islanders were evicted from the Chagos Archipelago but were insistent that Mauritius was wrong to bring the dispute over sovereignty of the strategic atoll group to the United Nations’ highest court and continues to refuse to allow them to return. The UK and its allies argued that this matter should not be decided by the court but should be resolved through bilateral negotiations, while bilateral discussions with Mauritius have been unfruitful over the past 50 years. On 25 February 2019, the judges of the International Court of Justice by thirteen votes to one stated that the United Kingdom is under an obligation to bring to an end its administration of the Chagos Archipelago as rapidly as possible. Only the American judge, Joan Donoghue, voted in favour of the UK. The president of the court, Abdulqawi Ahmed Yusuf, said the detachment of the Chagos Archipelago in 1965 from Mauritius had not been based on a "free and genuine expression of the people concerned." "This continued administration constitutes a wrongful act," he said, adding "The UK has an obligation to bring to an end its administration of the Chagos Archipelago as rapidly as possible and that all member states must co-operate with the United Nations to complete the decolonization of Mauritius."

On 22 May 2019, the United Nations General Assembly debated and adopted a resolution that affirmed that the Chagos Archipelago, which has been occupied by the UK for more than 50 years, "forms an integral part of the territory of Mauritius". The resolution gives effect to an advisory opinion of the ICJ, demanded that the UK "withdraw its colonial administration ... unconditionally within a period of no more than six months". 116 states voted in favour of the resolution, 55 abstained and only Australia, Hungary, Israel and Maldives supported the UK and US. During the debate, the Mauritian Prime Minister described the expulsion of Chagossians as "a crime against humanity". While the resolution is not legally binding, it carries significant political weight since the ruling came from the UN's highest court and the assembly vote reflects world opinion. The resolution also has immediate practical consequences: the UN, its specialised agencies, and all other international organisations are now bound, as a matter of UN law, to support the decolonisation of Mauritius even if the UK continues to claim the area.

The Maldives has a dispute with Mauritius with regards to the limit of its Exclusive Economic Zone (“EEZ”) and the EEZ of the Chagos Archipelago. In June 2019, Mauritius initiated arbitral proceedings against the Maldives at the International Tribunal for the Law of the Sea (“ITLOS”) to delimit its maritime boundary between the Maldives and the Chagos Archipelago. Among its preliminary objections, the Maldives argued that there was an unresolved sovereignty dispute between Mauritius and the UK over the Chagos Archipelago, which fell outside the scope of the ITLOS's jurisdiction. On 28 January 2021, the ITLOS concluded that the dispute between the UK and Mauritius had in fact already been determinatively resolved by the ICJ's earlier Advisory Opinion, and that there was therefore no bar to jurisdiction. The ITLOS rejected all five of the Maldives’ preliminary objections and found that Mauritius' claims are admissible.

On 3 November 2022, the British Foreign Secretary James Cleverly announced that the UK and Mauritius had decided to begin negotiations on sovereignty over the British Indian Ocean Territory, taking into account the recent international legal proceedings. Both states had agreed to ensure the continued operation of the joint UK/US military base on Diego Garcia.

Historical background 

Beginning in the late 15th century, Portuguese explorers began to venture into the Indian Ocean and recorded the location of Mauritius and the other Mascarene Islands, Rodrigues and Réunion (the latter presently a French overseas department). In the 16th century, the Portuguese were joined by Dutch and English sailors, both nations having established East India Companies to exploit the commercial opportunities of the Indian Ocean and the Far East. Although Mauritius was used as a stopping point in the long voyages to and from the Indian Ocean, no attempt was made to establish a permanent settlement.

The first permanent colony in Mauritius was established by the Dutch East India Company in 1638. The Dutch maintained a small presence on Mauritius, with a brief interruption, until 1710 at which point the Dutch East India Company abandoned the island. Following the Dutch departure, the French government took possession of Mauritius in 1715, renaming it the Île de France.

The Chagos Archipelago was known during this period, appearing on Portuguese charts as early as 1538, but remained largely untouched. France progressively claimed and surveyed the Archipelago in the mid-18th century and granted concessions for the establishment of coconut plantations, leading to permanent settlement. Throughout this period, France administered the Chagos Archipelago as a dependency of the Ile de France.

In 1810, the British captured the Ile de France and renamed it Mauritius. By the Treaty of Paris of 30 May 1814, France ceded the Ile de France and all its dependencies (including the Chagos Archipelago) to the United Kingdom.

The British Administration of Mauritius and the Chagos Archipelago 

From the date of the cession by France until 8 November 1965, when the Chagos Archipelago was detached from the colony of Mauritius, the Archipelago was administered by the United Kingdom as a Dependency of Mauritius. During this period, the economy of the Chagos Archipelago was primarily driven by the coconut plantations and the export of copra (dried coconut flesh) for the production of oil, although other activities developed as the population of the Archipelago expanded. British administration over the Chagos Archipelago was exercised by various means, including by visits to the Chagos Archipelago made by Special Commissioners and Magistrates from Mauritius.

Although the broad outlines of British Administration of the colony during this period are not in dispute, the Parties disagree as to the extent of economic activity in the Chagos Archipelago and its significance for Mauritius, and on the significance of the Archipelago's status as a dependency. Mauritius contends that there were "close economic, cultural and social links between Mauritius and the Chagos Archipelago" and that "the administration of the Chagos Archipelago as a constituent part of Mauritius continued without interruption throughout that period of British rule". The United Kingdom, in contrast, submits that the Chagos Archipelago was only "very loosely administered from Mauritius" and "in law and in fact quite distinct from the Island of Mauritius." The United Kingdom further contends that "the islands had no economic relevance to Mauritius, other than as a supplier of coconut oil" and that, in any event, economic, social and cultural ties between the Chagos Archipelago and Mauritius during this period are irrelevant to the Archipelago's legal status.

The independence of Mauritius 

Beginning in 1831, the administration of the British Governor of Mauritius was supplemented by the introduction of a Council of Government, originally composed of ex-officio members and members nominated by the Governor. The composition of this council was subsequently democratized through the progressive introduction of elected members. In 1947, the adoption of a new Constitution for Mauritius replaced the Council of Government with separate Legislative and Executive Councils. The Legislative Council was composed of the Governor as president, 19 elected members, 12 members nominated by the Governor and 3 ex-officio members.

The first election of the Legislative Council took place in 1948, and the Mauritius Labour Party (the "MLP") secured 12 of the 19 seats available for elected members. The MLP strengthened its position in the 1953 election by securing 14 of the available seats, although the MLP lacked an overall majority in the Legislative Council because of the presence of a number of members appointed by the Governor.

The 1953 election marked the beginning of Mauritius’ move towards independence. Following that election, Mauritian representatives began to press the British Government for universal suffrage, a ministerial system of government and greater elected representation in the Legislative Council. By 1959, the MLP-led government had openly adopted the goal of complete independence.

Constitutional Conferences were held in 1955, 1958, 1961, and 1965, resulting in a new constitution in 1958 and the creation of the post of Chief Minister in 1961 (renamed as the Premier after 1963). In 1962 Seewoosagur Ramgoolam became the Chief Minister within a Council of Ministers chaired by the Governor and, following the 1963 election, formed an all-party coalition government to pursue negotiations with the British on independence.

The final Constitutional Conference was held in London in September 1965 and was principally concerned with the debate between those Mauritian political leaders favouring independence and those preferring some form of continued association with the United Kingdom. On 24 September 1965, the responsible UK government minister, Anthony Greenwood, announced that the UK intended for Mauritius to become independent. Mauritius became independent on 12 March 1968.

Detachment of the Chagos Archipelago 

During negotiations on granting Mauritian independence, the UK proposed to separate the Chagos Archipelago from the colony of Mauritius. Only Mauritius would become independent, with the UK retaining the Chagos under British control. According to Mauritius, the proposal stemmed from a UK decision in the early 1960s to "accommodate the United States’ desire to use certain islands in the Indian Ocean for defence purposes."

The record before the Tribunal sets out a series of bilateral talks between the United Kingdom and the United States in 1964 at which the two States decided that, in order to execute the plans for a military facility in the Chagos Archipelago, the United Kingdom would "provide the land, and security of tenure, by detaching islands and placing them under direct U.K. administration."

The suitability of Diego Garcia as the site of the planned military base was determined following a joint survey of the Chagos Archipelago and certain islands of the Seychelles in 1964. Following the survey, the United States sent its proposals to the United Kingdom, identifying Diego Garcia as its first preference as the site for the military facility. The United Kingdom and the United States conducted further negotiations between 1964 and 1965 regarding the desirability of "detachment of the entire Chagos Archipelago," as well as the islands of Aldabra, Farquhar and Desroches (then part of the Colony of the Seychelles). They further discussed the terms of compensation that would be required "to secure the acceptance of the proposals by the local Governments."

On 19 July 1965, the Governor of Mauritius was instructed to communicate the proposal to detach the Chagos Archipelago to the Mauritius Council of Ministers and to report back on the council's reaction. The initial reaction of the Mauritian Ministers, conveyed by the Governor's report of 23 July 1965, was a request for more time to consider the proposal. The report also noted that Sir Seewoosagur Ramgoolam expressed "dislike of detachment". At the next meeting of the council on 30 July 1965, the Mauritian Ministers indicated that detachment would be "unacceptable to public opinion in Mauritius" and proposed the alternative of a long-term lease, coupled with safeguards for mineral rights and a preference for Mauritius if fishing or agricultural rights were ever granted. The Parties differ in their understanding of the strength of, and motivation for, the Mauritian reaction. In any event, on 13 August 1965, the Governor of Mauritius informed the Mauritian Ministers that the United States objected to the proposal of a lease.

Discussions over the detachment of the Chagos Archipelago continued in a series of meetings between certain Mauritian political leaders, including Sir Seewoosagur Ramgoolam, and the Secretary of State for the Colonies, Anthony Greenwood, coinciding with the Constitutional Conference of September 1965 in London. Over the course of three meetings, the Mauritian leaders pressed the United Kingdom with respect to the compensation offered for Mauritian agreement to the detachment of the Archipelago, noting the involvement of the United States in the establishment of the defence facility and Mauritius’ need for continuing economic support (for example through a higher quota for Mauritius sugar imports into the United States), rather than the lump sum compensation being proposed by the United Kingdom. The United Kingdom took the firm position that obtaining concessions from the United States was not feasible; the United Kingdom did, however, increase the level of lump sum compensation on offer from £1 million to £3 million and introduced the prospect of a commitment that the Archipelago would be returned to Mauritius when no longer needed for defence purposes. The Mauritian leaders also met with the Economic Minister at the U.S. Embassy in London on the question of sugar quotas, and Sir Seewoosagur Ramgoolam met privately with Prime Minister Harold Wilson on the morning of 23 September 1965. The United Kingdom's record of this conversation records Prime Minister Wilson having told Sir Seewoosagur Ramgoolam that

The meetings culminated in the afternoon of 23 September 1965 (the "Lancaster House Meeting") in a provisional agreement on the part of Sir Seewoosagur Ramgoolam and his colleagues to agree in principle to the detachment of the Archipelago in exchange for the Secretary of State recommending certain actions by the United Kingdom to the Cabinet. The draft record of the Lancaster House Meeting set out the following:

Thereafter, Sir Seewoosagur Ramgoolam addressed a handwritten note to the Under-Secretary of State at the Colonial Office, Mr Trafford Smith, setting out further conditions relating to navigational and meteorological facilities on the Archipelago, fishing rights, emergency landing facilities, and the benefit of mineral or oil discoveries.

On 6 October 1965, instructions were sent to the Governor of Mauritius to secure "early confirmation that the Mauritius Government is willing to agree that Britain should now take the necessary legal steps to detach the Chagos Archipelago from Mauritius on the conditions enumerated in (i)–(viii) in paragraph 22 of the enclosed record [of the Lancaster House Meeting]." The Secretary of State went on to note that -

On 5 November 1965, the Governor of Mauritius informed the Colonial Office as follows:

The Governor also noted that "Parti Mauricien Social Démocrate (PMSD) Ministers dissented and (are now) considering their position in the government." The Parties differ regarding the extent to which Mauritian consent to the detachment was given voluntarily.

The detachment of the Chagos Archipelago was effected by the establishment of the British Indian Ocean Territory (BIOT) on 8 November 1965 by Order in Council. Pursuant to the Order in Council, the governance of the newly created BIOT was made the responsibility of the office of the BIOT Commissioner, appointed by the Queen upon the advice of the United Kingdom FCO. The BIOT Commissioner is assisted in the day-to-day management of the territory by a BIOT Administrator.

On the same day, the Secretary of State cabled the Governor of Mauritius as follows:

On 12 November 1965, the Governor of Mauritius cabled the Colonial Office, querying whether the Mauritian Ministers could make public reference to the items in paragraph 22 of the record of the Lancaster House Meeting and adding "[i]n this connection I trust further consideration promised . . . will enable categorical assurances to be given."

On 19 November 1965, the Colonial Office cabled the Governor of Mauritius as follows: U.K./U.S. defence interests;

A few weeks after the proposal to detach the islands from Mauritius, the United Nations General Assembly passed Resolution 2066(XX) on 16 December 1965, which stated that detaching part of a colonial territory was against customary international law and the UN Resolution 1514 passed on 14 December 1960. This resolution stated that "Any attempt aimed at the partial or total disruption of the national unity and the territorial integrity of a country is incompatible with the purposes and principles of the Charter of the United Nations."

Depopulation 

After initially denying that the islands were inhabited, British officials forcibly expelled approximately 2,000 Chagossians to mainland Mauritius to allow the United States to establish a military base on Diego Garcia. Since 1971, the atoll of Diego Garcia is inhabited by some 3,000 UK and US military and civilian contracted personnel. The British and American governments routinely deny Chagossian requests for the right of return.

Marine protected area 

A marine protected area (MPA) around the Chagos Islands known as the Chagos Marine Protected Area was created by the British Government on 1 April 2010 and enforced on 1 November 2010. It is the world's largest fully protected reserve, twice the size of Great Britain. The designation proved controversial as the decision was announced during a period when the UK Parliament was in recess.

On 1 December 2010, WikiLeaks release a leaked US Embassy London diplomatic cable dating back to 2009  which exposed British and US calculations in creating the marine nature reserve. The cable relays exchanges between US Political Counselor Richard Mills and British Director of the Foreign and Commonwealth Office Colin Roberts, in which Roberts "asserted that establishing a marine park would, in effect, put paid to resettlement claims of the archipelago’s former residents." Richard Mills concludes:

The cable (reference ID "09LONDON1156" ) was classified as confidential and "no foreigners", and leaked as part of the Cablegate cache.

Resettlement study 

In March 2014, it was reported that the UK government would send experts to the islands to examine "options and risks" of resettlement.

Legal proceedings

Case before Permanent Court of Arbitration 

The Government of Mauritius initiated proceedings on 20 December 2010 against the UK Government under the United Nations Convention on the Law of the Sea (UNCLOS) to challenge the legality of the ‘marine protected area’. Mauritius argues that Britain breached a UN resolution when it separated Chagos from the rest of the colony of Mauritius in the 1960s, before the country became independent, and that Britain therefore doesn't have the right to declare the area a marine reserve and that the MPA was not compatible with the rights of the Chagossians.

On 18 March 2015, the Permanent Court of Arbitration ruled that the Chagos Marine Protected Area was illegal.

Case before International Court of Justice 

On 23 June 2017, the United Nations General Assembly (UNGA) voted in favour of referring the territorial dispute between Mauritius and the UK to the International Court of Justice (ICJ) in order to clarify the legal status of the Chagos Islands archipelago in the Indian Ocean. The motion was approved by a majority vote with 94 voting for and 15 against.

In its 25 February 2019 ruling, the Court deemed the United Kingdom's separation of the Chagos Islands from the rest of Mauritius in 1965, when both were colonial territories, to be unlawful and found that the United Kingdom is obliged to end "its administration of the Chagos Islands as rapidly as possible." Largely because of the detachment of the islands, the ICJ determined that the decolonization of Mauritius was still not lawfully completed.

Case before International Tribunal for the Law of the Sea 
On 28 January 2021, the United Nation's International Tribunal for the Law of the Sea ruled, in a dispute between Mauritius and Maldives on their maritime boundary, that the United Kingdom has no sovereignty over the Chagos Archipelago, and that Mauritius is sovereign there. The United Kingdom disputes and does not recognise the tribunal's decision.

See also 
 List of sovereign states and dependent territories in the Indian Ocean
 Sovereignty disputes of the United Kingdom
 List of islands in Chagos Archipelago
 List of territorial disputes

References

External links
Who Owns Diego Garcia? Decolonisation and Indigenous Rights in the Indian Ocean
Ruling of THE UNITED NATIONS CONVENTION ON THE LAW OF THE SEA ARBITRAL TRIBUNAL about the CHAGOS MARINE PROTECTED AREA
http://www.letusreturnusa.org/

Film and video
 Chagos: A Documentary Film
 Stealing a Nation (TV documentary, 2004), a Special Report by John Pilger

 
Chagos Archipelago
British Indian Ocean Territory
Politics of Mauritius
Politics of the Maldives
Maldives and the Commonwealth of Nations
Mauritius and the Commonwealth of Nations
Mauritius–United Kingdom relations
Maldives–United Kingdom relations
Maldives–Mauritius relations
Territorial disputes of the United Kingdom
Territorial disputes of the Maldives
Territorial disputes of Mauritius
United Kingdom and the Commonwealth of Nations
Sovereignty
International disputes